Cape Canaveral Launch Complex 5 (LC-5) was a launch site at Cape Canaveral Space Force Station, Florida used for various Redstone and Jupiter launches.

It is most well known as the launch site for NASA's 1961 suborbital Mercury-Redstone 3 flight, which made Alan Shepard the first American in space. It was also the launch site of Gus Grissom's July, 1961, Mercury-Redstone 4 flight. The Mercury-Redstone 1 pad abort, Mercury-Redstone 1A, and the January, 1961, Mercury-Redstone 2 with a chimpanzee, Ham, aboard, also used LC-5.

A total of 23 launches were conducted from LC-5: one Jupiter-A, six Jupiter IRBMs, one Jupiter-C, four Juno Is, four Juno IIs and seven Redstones. The first launch from the complex was a Jupiter-A on July 19, 1956 and the final launch was Gus Grissom's Liberty Bell 7 capsule on July 21, 1961.

LC-5 is located next to the Air Force Space and Missile Museum which is located at LC-26. The original launch consoles and computers are on display in the LC-5 blockhouse.  a tour of the museum can be arranged through the Kennedy Space Center Visitor Complex's  "Cape Canaveral: Early Space Tour".  One tour is offered daily, so the number of visitors is limited by the size of the tour.

Launch chronology

July 19, 1956:  Jupiter-A CC-13
September 20, 1956: Jupiter-C RS-27
March 1, 1957: Jupiter IRBM AM-1A
April 26, 1957: Jupiter IRBM AM-1B
May 31, 1957:  Jupiter IRBM AM-1
March 26, 1958: Juno I RS-24 (Explorer 3)
May 17, 1958: Redstone RS-1002
July 26, 1958: Juno I RS/CC-44 (Explorer 4)
August 24, 1958: Juno I RS/CC-47 (Explorer 5)
October 23, 1958:  Juno I RS/CC-49 (Beacon 1)
December 6, 1958:  Juno II AM-11 (Pioneer 3)
January 22, 1959:  Jupiter IRBM CM-21
March 3, 1959:  Juno II AM-14 (Pioneer 4)
May 14, 1959: Jupiter IRBM AM-17
July 16, 1959:  Juno II AM-16 (Explorer S-1, failed)
August 27, 1959:  Jupiter IRBM AM-19
October 13, 1959: Juno II AM-19A (Explorer 7)
November 21, 1960: Redstone MRLV-1 (MR-1)
December 19, 1960: Redstone MRLV-3 (MR-1A)
January 31, 1961: Redstone MRLV-2 (MR-2)
March 24, 1961: Redstone MRLV-5 (MR-BD)
May 5, 1961: Redstone MRLV-7 (MR-3)
July 21, 1961: Redstone MRLV-8 (MR-4)

Gallery

See also
Air Force Space and Missile Museum
List of Cape Canaveral and Merritt Island launch sites
Project Mercury
Jupiter
Redstone
Cape Canaveral Launch Complex 6 - used the same blockhouse

References

External links
https://web.archive.org/web/20090414180519/http://www.astronautix.com/sites/capallc5.htm

Cape Canaveral Space Force Station
Project Mercury